G-Men Never Forget is a 1948 Republic movie serial.  The serial was condensed into a feature film in 1966 and re-released under the title Code 645.

Plot
Escaped criminal Victor Murkland (Roy Barcroft) kidnaps the police commissioner and, with the aid of plastic surgery, takes his place. Federal Agent Ted O'Hara (Clayton Moore) is called in to try to stop the wave of crime initiated by Murkland, not knowing that Murkland is posing as the police commissioner and is aware of O'Haras' every move. The real commissioner is being held captive in a mental hospital run by Dr. Benson (Stanley Price). O'Hara is aided by the beautiful Sgt. Frances Blake (Ramsay Ames). Murkland's gang threatens to destroy a major tunnel being built underneath a channel, and blackmails the builder into paying him protection money.

Cast
 Clayton Moore as Agent Ted O'Hara
 Roy Barcroft as Victor Murkland/Commissioner Angus Cameron
 Ramsay Ames as Frances Blake
 Drew Allen as Duke Graham
 Tom Steele as Parker, a thug
 Dale Van Sickel as Brent/Slocum, both thugs
 Edmund Cobb as R.J. Cook
 Stanley Price as 'Doc' Benson
 Jack O'Shea as Slater

Production
G-Men Never Forget was budgeted at $151,061 although the final negative cost was $151,554 (a $493, or 0.3%, overspend).  It was the most expensive Republic serial of 1948.

It was filmed between July 16 and August 7, 1947.  The serial's production number was 1698.

Stunts
Tom Steele as Agent Ted O'Hara/Vic Murkland/Commissioner Angus Cameron/Duke Graham (doubling Clayton Moore, Drew Allen & Roy Barcroft)
Dale Van Sickel as Agent Ted O'Hara/Duke Graham (doubling Clayton Moore & Drew Allen)
David Sharpe
John Daheim
Duke Green
Carey Loftin
George Magrill
Gil Perkins
Ken Terrell
Bud Wolfe

Special effects
The special effects were created by the Lydecker brothers.

Release

Theatrical
G-Men Never Forget'''s official release date is January 31, 1948, although this is actually the date the sixth chapter was made available to film exchanges.

TelevisionG-Men Never Forget was one of twenty-six Republic serials re-released as a film on television in 1966.  The title of the film was changed to Code 645''.  This version was cut down to 100-minutes in length.

Chapter titles
 Death Rides the Torrent (20min)
 The Flaming Doll House/100,000 Volts (13min 20s)
 Code Six-Four-Five (13min 20s)
 Shipyard Saboteurs (13min 20s)
 The Dead Man Speaks (13min 20s)
 Marked Money/Marked Evidence (13min 20s)
 Hot Cargo (13min 20s)
 The Fatal Letter (13min 20s)
 The Death Wind (13min 20s) - a re-cap chapter
 The Innocent Victim (13min 20s)
 Counter-Plot (13min 20s)
 Exposed (13min 20s)
Source:

See also
 List of film serials by year
 List of film serials by studio

References

External links
 

1948 films
1948 crime films
American black-and-white films
1940s English-language films
Republic Pictures film serials
American crime films
Films directed by Yakima Canutt
1940s American films